Go Sailor was an American, short-lived Berkeley-based twee pop band. Its members included Rose Melberg of Tiger Trap and The Softies (guitar, vocals), Paul Curran of Crimpshrine (bass) and Amy Linton of Henry's Dress (later of The Aislers Set) (drums). They recorded three 7-inch singles and an album on Lookout! Records in 1996, the latter of which collected the singles tracks and two compilation appearances. After their breakup their songs "Ray of Sunshine" and "Together Forever in Love" were included on the soundtrack to the movie But I'm a Cheerleader.

Discography
 Fine Day for Sailing 7-inch EP (Yoyo Recordings, 1994)
 Long Distance 7-inch EP (Slumberland, 1995)
 Don't Go 7-inch EP (Lookout! Records, 1996)
 Go Sailor (Lookout! Records, 1996) – This release compiles the three 7-inch EPs plus two compilation tracks.
 Go Sailor (Slumberland, 2011) - This vinyl-only album compiles all three of their singles plus compilation tracks, similar to the Lookout! Records CD issued in 1996.
 "Long Distance (Alternate Mix)" 7-inch single (Slumberland, 2011) - This vinyl-only single sided record was released for the 20th anniversary of Slumberland Records. (on army green vinyl)

Compilations
"Last Year" on Periscope, Yoyo Recordings (1994)

References
[ AllMusic listing]
Lookout! Records profile

Indie pop groups from California